Satalyst Verve Racing Team was an Australian UCI Continental cycling team, that competed between 2008 and 2018.

Major wins
2015
Stage 6 Tour of Iran (Azerbaijan), Theodore Yates

References

UCI Continental Teams (Oceania)
Cycling teams established in 2008
Cycling teams based in Australia
2008 establishments in Australia
Cycling teams disestablished in 2018
2018 disestablishments in Australia